The Water Leaper, also known as Llamhigyn Y Dwr, is an evil creature from Welsh folklore that lived in swamps and ponds.

It is described as a giant frog with a bat's wings instead of forelegs, no hind legs, and a long, lizard-like tail with a stinger at the end. It jumps across the water using its wings, hence its name.

It was blamed for problems ranging from snapping fishing lines to eating livestock or even fishermen.

References

 Katharine Briggs, An Encyclopedia of Fairies, Hobgoblins, Brownies, Boogies, and Other Supernatural Creatures, "Llamhigyn Y Dwr", p270. 

Welsh legendary creatures
Legendary amphibians